This is a list of mayors of Morges, Vaud, Switzerland. The mayor (syndic) chairs the municipal council (Municipalité) of Morges.

References 

Morges
 
Morges